The striped panray (Zanobatus schoenleinii) is a species of ray in the family Zanobatidae. It was considered the only species in its genus and family until the description of the maculate panray (Z. maculatus) in 2016.

The striped panray is found in the warm East Atlantic Ocean, ranging from Morocco, through the Gulf of Guinea to Angola.

Its upperparts are brownish with a distinct dark blotched and barred pattern. It resembles the maculate panray, but that species is only known from the Gulf of Guinea (Ivory Coast to Gabon), is smaller (up to around ), has a less striped pattern and a more thorny back.

Little is known about the biology of the striped panray and the IUCN has assessed it as being Vulnerable.

References

striped panray
Fish of the East Atlantic
Marine fauna of West Africa
striped panray